Ignacio Alfaro Arregui (3 May 1918 – 24 July 2000) was a Spanish military officer who served as Chief of the Defence High Command  between 1978 and 1980, and as President of the Board of Joint Chiefs of Staff  between 1978 and 1982. The offices he held made him chief of staff of the Spanish Armed Forces at the time.

References

1918 births
2000 deaths
People from Burgos
20th-century Spanish military personnel
Spanish lieutenant generals